The 3 arrondissements of the Haute-Vienne department are:
 Arrondissement of Bellac, (subprefecture: Bellac) with 57 communes. The population of the arrondissement was 39,204 in 2016.  
 Arrondissement of Limoges, (prefecture of the Haute-Vienne department: Limoges) with 108 communes.  The population of the arrondissement was 297,957 in 2016.  
 Arrondissement of Rochechouart, (subprefecture: Rochechouart) with 30 communes.  The population of the arrondissement was 37,817 in 2016.

History

In 1800 the arrondissements of Limoges, Bellac, Rochechouart and Saint-Yrieix were established. The arrondissement of Saint-Yrieix was disbanded in 1926.

References

Haute-Vienne